Eadie is a unisex given name. Notable people with the name include:

 Eadie Adams (1907–1983), American film actress
 Eadie Fraser (1860–1886), Scottish football player
 Eadie Wetzel (1952–2015), American swimmer

See also
 Eadie (surname)

Unisex given names